Beata Asimakopoulou (June 28, 1932 – April 20, 2009) was a Greek actress.

Family
She was married to Greek film director Orestis Laskos; they had at least one child, a son, Vassilis Laskos.
She died of cancer.

Career
She appeared in the following: 
  (2007)
  (2003) TV series
  (2002) (TV)
  (1997) TV series
  (1995)
  (1985)
  (1985)
  (1974)
  (1973)
  (1968)
  (1967)
  (1967)
  (1967)
  (1966)
  (1965)
  (1965)
  (1965)
  (1964)
  (1964)
  (1964)
  (1963)
  (1963)
  (1962)
  (1962)
  (1962)
  (1962)
  (1962)
  (1961)
  (1961)
  (1960)
  (1960)
  (1959)
  (1959)
  (1959)
  (1958)
  (1958)
  (1958)
  (1958)
  (1958)
  (1956)

References

External links

Photos
Biodata 

1930s births
2009 deaths
Greek film actresses
Greek television actresses
Actresses from Athens
People from Dimitsana
Deaths from cancer in Greece